Liujia Township is a township in Beizhen, Liaoning, China.

Administrative division
As of 2016, the township is divided into eight villages: 
 Liudong
 Dongqingduizi
 Shuangjia
 Bajiazi
 Guanyingzi
 Liujia
 Yuzhou
 Xinfeng

Geography
The Dongsha Stream and Raoyang Stream flow through the town.

Economy
The economy of the township has a predominantly agricultural orientation, including farming and pig-breeding. Agricultural crops include corn, sorghum, soybean, rice, vegetable, grape, and peach.

Transportation
The Provincial Highway S210 passes across the township.

References

Townships of Jinzhou
Divisions of Beizhen